Tanjung Aru railway station is one of four main railway station on the Western Sabah Railway Line located in Tanjung Aru, Kota Kinabalu, Sabah, Malaysia.

History 

As part of the development of rail networks in North Borneo, construction of rail networks have started since 1896 with the networks from Tanjung Aru passing through the major towns of Kinarut, Papar and Beaufort. Full operation service of the North Borneo Railway was launched on 1 August 1914. In 2007, the station was closed for renovation works with the station building which is originally built from wood are demolished and replaced with a new concrete building.

In 2016, new diesel multiple unit (DMUs) from Japan for use in the Tanjung Aru–Beaufort lines was introduced. Previously, there is a main station in Jesselton  (present-day Kota Kinabalu) but were closed in 1974, leaving Tanjung Aru station as the starting point for the rail service in the city. Following the completion of Aeropod, the station was moved into its current location with new building and additional facilities for light rail transit (LRT).

References

External links 
 

Railway stations opened in 1914
Railway stations in Sabah